Xincheng County is a county in the central part of Guangxi, China. It is the westernmost county-level division of the prefecture-level city of Laibin.

Climate

References

Counties of Guangxi
Laibin